The Royal Family is a novel by the American author William T. Vollmann. The novel centers around Henry Tyler's private investigative work and his personal desire to find the mysterious Queen of Whores, the matriarch of the prostitutes in the area of Tenderloin, San Francisco.

Structure
The novel is divided into thirty-six books, sub-divided into five hundred and ninety-three chapters.

Book I, The Reduction Method
Book II, Irene
Book III, Visits and Visitations
Book IV, Billable Hours
Book V, The Mark of Cain
Book VI, Ladies of the Queen
Book VII, Sometimes It Helps to Talk About These Things
Book VIII, Sunflower
Book IX, Easier Than You Might Ever Dream
Book X, An Essay on Bail
Book XI, Easier Than You Might Ever Dream (continued)
Book XII, The False Irene
Book XIII, "Business Comes First"
Book XIV, Domino
Book XV, Vigs
Book XVI, The Queen of Las Vegas
Book XVII, Buying Their Dream Home
Book XVIII, Feminine Circus
Book XIX, A Meditation on the Stock Market
Book XX, "Demons Are Here"
Book XXI, Jesus
Book XXII, The Wicked King's Secret
Book XXIII, Justin
Book XXIV, Sapphire
Book XXV, The Truth
Book XXVI, Celia
Book XXVII, Geary Street
Book XXVIII, John
Book XXIX, Space Invaders
Book XXX, Little Baby Birds
Book XXXI, Filial Duties
Book XXXII, The Fall of Canaan
Book XXXIII, Kitty's Soliloquy
Book XXXIV, Dan Smooth
Book XXXV, Coffee Camp
Book XXXVI, The Royal Family

2000 American novels
Novels set in San Francisco
Novels about American prostitution
Viking Press books